Willerzie is a village of Wallonia and a district of the municipality of Gedinne, located in the province of Namur, Belgium.

Former municipalities of Namur (province)